Auchonvillers is a commune in the Somme department in Hauts-de-France in northern France.

Its name seems to come from an old German man's name Alko (hypocoristic for a name starting Alk-) or similar (who invaded with the Franks in the 5th century AD), and Latin villare ("[land] belonging to a villa, farm").

First World War
The area was involved in the Battle of the Somme. There is a Commonwealth War Cemetery in the commune. English-speaking troops commonly rendered the place's name as "Ocean Villas".

See also
Communes of the Somme department

References

Communes of Somme (department)